The ARINC 629 computer bus was introduced in May 1995 and is used on the Boeing 777. The ARINC 629 bus operates as a multiple-source, multiple-sink system; each terminal can transmit data to, and receive data from, every other terminal on the data bus. This allows much more freedom in the exchange of data between units in the avionics system. ARINC 629 has the ability to accommodate up to a total of 128 terminals on a data bus and supports a data rate of 2 Mbit/s.

The ARINC 629 data bus was developed by the Airlines Electronic Engineering Committee (AEEC) to replace the ARINC 429 bus.
The ARINC 629 data bus was based on the Boeing DATAC bus.

References

Computer buses
Avionics
Computer-related introductions in 1995
ARINC standards
Serial buses